Jiban Ghosh (6 October 1935 – 15 December 2004) was an Indian cricket umpire. He stood in four Test matches between 1979 and 1986 and three ODI games between 1981 and 1984.

See also
 List of Test cricket umpires
 List of One Day International cricket umpires

References

1935 births
2004 deaths
Place of birth missing
Indian Test cricket umpires
Indian One Day International cricket umpires